Piccolo is an Italian surname. Notable people with the surname include:
 Alessandro Piccolo (agricultural scientist) (born 1951), Italian chemist and agricultural scientist
 Alessandro Piccolo (racing driver) (born 1980), Italian racing driver
 Antonio Piccolo (born 1988), Italian footballer
 Antonio Piccolo (footballer, born 1990), Italian footballer
 Brian Piccolo (1943–1970), American National Football League player
 Felice Piccolo (born 1983), Italian footballer
 Frank Piccolo (1921-1981), American mobster
 Francesco Piccolo (born 1964), Italian writer and screenwriter
 Francesco Piccolo (politician), leader of the Venetian People's Movement
 Francisco María Piccolo (1654–1729), Sicilian Jesuit missionary in Mexico
 María Jimena Piccolo (born 1985), Argentine actress
 Michele Piccolo (born 1985), Italian footballer
 Ottavia Piccolo (born 1949), Italian theatre and film actress
 Renato Piccolo (born 1962), Italian former cyclist
 Rina Piccolo, Canadian cartoonist
 Rino Piccolo, international film producer, and film commissioner
 Sol Piccolo (born 1996), Argentine female volleyball player
 Tony Piccolo (born 1960), Australian politician

See also
 Joseph LoPiccolo (disambiguation)
 Salvatore Lo Piccolo (born 1942), Sicilian mafioso

Italian-language surnames